Campiglossa ignobilis is a species of tephritid or fruit flies in the genus Campiglossa of the family Tephritidae.

Distribution
The species is found in Yemen, Africa.

References

Tephritinae
Insects described in 1861
Diptera of Asia
Diptera of Africa
Taxa named by Hermann Loew